"It's Ecstasy When You Lay Down Next to Me" is a hit song by American singer Barry White.  The song was written by Ekundayo Paris and Nelson Pigford, and arranged by Barry White.

Chart performance
Released from his album Barry White Sings for Someone You Love. The song spent five weeks at the top (#1) of the R&B singles charts during the fall of 1977, and was also a big hit on the pop charts, peaking at number four on the Billboard Hot 100 singles chart, and was his sixth and last top ten hit.

Samples
Another song which uses the same beat of "It's Ecstasy" is Le Pamplemousse's "Le Spank" from 1977. 
The track was later sampled by Mary J. Blige on her single "You Bring Me Joy" (1994) 
The track was also heavily sampled in the song "Rock DJ" (2000) by Robbie Williams.

Popular culture
The song was featured in Grand Theft Auto: Vice City Stories, as part of the playlist of the in-game radio station VCFL.

References 

1977 songs
1977 singles
Barry White songs
20th Century Fox Records singles